Bucak (pronounced 'budjak') is a Turkish word meaning "corner", and in the administrative sense, a subdistrict. Its variants are also names for various localities in Asia and Europe. 

 Bucak (administrative unit), subdistricts of Turkey, also known as nahiyes
 Bucak, Burdur, a town and district of Burdur Province, Turkey
 Bucak, Çivril
 Budjak, a region in Southern Bessarabia
 Sedat Bucak (born 1960), Turkish chieftain and politician

See also
 Budjak (disambiguation)
 Bujak (disambiguation)
 Bucaq, Yevlakh (disambiguation)

Turkish words and phrases
Turkish-language surnames